Walter Clement Powell (1850–1883) was an American photographer and the first cousin of Major John Wesley Powell. Powell was a participant and assistant photographer on Major Powell's second trip down the Colorado River in 1871.

References

American photographers
1850 births
1883 deaths